Ernest Wadsworth Longfellow (1845–1921) was an American artist in Boston, Massachusetts, and New York. He was the son of Henry Wadsworth Longfellow.

Biography
Ernest Longfellow was born in Cambridge, Massachusetts, and raised at Craigie House. He was the second of six children, including his younger sister Alice Mary Longfellow. Educated at Harvard College, he passed the winter of 1865 and '66 in Paris in work and study, and the summers of 1876 and '77 in Villiers-le-Bel under Couture. He married Harriet "Hattie" Spelman in 1868. An 1874 newspaper gossiped about him: "Ernest Longfellow, the son of the poet, is described as a slender, delicate young man, an artist of talent, great at ten-pins, and tip-top at gunning."

"His professional life has been spent in Boston, with frequent visits to Europe." In the 1870s he kept a studio on West Street. He exhibited at the National Academy of Design in 1871 and 1875; the Williams & Everett gallery in Boston in 1875; the 1876 World's Fair in Philadelphia; and Boston's Museum of Fine Arts and the St. Botolph Club in 1880. He belonged to the Boston Art Club. He moved to New York around the turn of the century.

He died in November 1921 at the Hotel Touraine in Boston. "The funeral was held from the Craigie House; ... services conducted by the Rev. Samuel A. Eliot." Longfellow bequeathed some 55 paintings from his collection to the Museum of Fine Arts, Boston, including works by Jacopo Bassano, John Constable, Thomas Couture, Luca Giordano, and others.

References

Further reading

Works by E.W. Longfellow
 Twenty poems from Henry Wadsworth Longfellow; illustrated from paintings by his son Ernest W. Longfellow. Boston: Houghton Mifflin, 1884. Google books
 Ernest Wadsworth Longfellow. Random memories. Boston: Houghton Mifflin Company, 1922. Google books

Works about E.W. Longfellow
 Earl Marble. Longfellow Exhibition. The Aldine, Vol. 8, No. 4 (1876)
 Clara Erskine Clement and Laurence Hutton. Artists of the nineteenth century and their works: A handbook containing two thousand and fifty biographical sketches, Volume 2. Boston: Houghton, Osgood, 1879. Google books
 Men and women of America: a biographical dictionary of contemporaries. NY: L.R. Hamersly & Company, 1909. Google books
 Who's who in New England. 1909, 1915.
 Who's who in America. 1914.
 Cut off Pacifist Nephews; Longfellow's Son Left Most of $300,000 Estate to Widow. Kansas City Star; Date: 12-08-1921
 The Bequest of Ernest Wadsworth Longfellow. Museum of Fine Arts Bulletin, Vol. 21, No. 128 (Dec., 1923), pp. 76–77

External links

 WorldCat. Longfellow, Ernest Wadsworth 1845-1921
 US National Park Service. Ernest Longfellow
 Archives of American Art. Ernest Wadsworth and Harriet S. Wadsworth Longfellow sketchbooks, 1867-1903
 Harvard College. The Longfellow Family in Italy. Photograph, 1869. Group portrait including Hattie and Ernest Longfellow.

Image gallery

1845 births
1921 deaths
19th century in Boston
19th-century American painters
19th-century American male artists
20th-century American painters
Appleton family
American art collectors
American male painters
Artists from Cambridge, Massachusetts
Harvard College alumni
Orientalist painters
20th-century American male artists